The 2015–16 season will be Crawley Town's 120th season in their history and their first season back in League Two since being relegated from League One the previous season. Along with League Two, the club also competed in the FA Cup, League Cup and League Trophy. The season covers the period from 1 July 2015 to 30 June 2016.

Competitions

Pre-season friendlies
On 5 May 2015, Crawley Town announced a friendly against Brighton & Hove Albion on 22 July 2015. On 6 May 2015, Crawley added a trip to Burgess Hill Town on 15 July 2015 as part of their pre-season schedule. On 12 May 2015, Crawley Town announced a third friendly, they will visit Maidstone United on 25 July 2015. On 27 May 2015, Crawley Town announced another two friendlies against Reading and Nuneaton Town. A day later the club confirmed Fulham will visit on 18 July 2015. On 16 June 2015, Crawley Town announced they will visit Whitehawk during pre-season.

League Two

League table

Matches
On 17 June 2015, the fixtures for the forthcoming season were announced.

FA Cup

League Cup
On 16 June 2015, the first round draw was made, Crawley Town were drawn away against Peterborough United.

Football League Trophy
On 5 September 2015, the second round draw was shown live on Soccer AM and drawn by Charlie Austin and Ed Skrein. Crawley are to host Southend United.

Transfers

Transfers in

Transfers out

Loans in

Loans out

References

2015-16
Crawley Town